Marin Jurić-Čivro (born 5 May 1995) is a Croatian singer. He rose to fame after placing third in season one of The Voice Hrvatska.

Music career
Starting 7 February 2015, Marin Jurić-Čivro appeared as a contestant on the first season of the reality talent show The Voice Hrvatska. On the first show, Jurić sang Bill Withers' song "Ain't No Sunshine". Two judges, Indira Levak and Ivan Dečak turned around with Jurić choosing Ivan Dečak as his coach  On 7 March 2015, in the Battle Round, Jurić's coach Dečak put him against Azra Kuštrić Skender choosing that they both sing "One", originally by U2 and Mary J. Blige. As a result, Dečak picked him to continue his journey into the live shows. On 28 March 2015, Jurić a rendition of Jeff Buckley's song "Hallelujah". During the Top 16, Jurić sang a rendition of Damir Urban's "Mjesto za mene". In the Top 12, he sang Deep Purple's "Soldier of Fortune". At the semi-final on 18 April 2015, Jurić performed Hozier's "Take Me to Church" and advanced to the final. At the finals, Jurić sang the song "Tango" along with his coach Ivan Dečak, he also re-sang his audition song "Ain't No Sunshine". He finished third overall.

On 16 June 2015, Jurić released his debut single "Dobro jutro svima". On 23 December 2019, Jurić was announced as one of the 16 participants in Dora 2020, the national contest in Croatia to select the country's Eurovision Song Contest 2020 entry, with the song "Naivno".

Discography

Singles

Awards and nominations

References

External links

21st-century Croatian male singers
Living people
1995 births